Nevada's 16th Senate district is one of 21 districts in the Nevada Senate. It has been represented by Republican Don Tatro since November 2021.

Geography
District 16 is based in the independent city of Carson City and southern Washoe County, covering Incline Village, Washoe Valley, and parts of Reno and Sparks.

The district is located entirely within Nevada's 2nd congressional district, and overlaps with the 26th and 40th districts of the Nevada Assembly. It borders the state of California.

Recent election results
Nevada Senators are elected to staggered four-year terms; since 2012 redistricting, the 16th district has held elections in midterm years.

2018

2014

Federal and statewide results in District 16

References 

16
Washoe County, Nevada
Carson City, Nevada